, is a 1956 Japanese black and white film directed by Shigeyoshi Suzuki. The film is based on the novel by Hitomi Takagaki.

Cast 
 Yoshirō Kitahara (北原義郎)
 Yoshiko Fujita
 Yoshihiro Hamaguchi

See also 
 Eye of the Jaguar (豹の眼), 1956 film

References

External links 
  http://www2u.biglobe.ne.jp/~kazu60/zanmai09/retoro01.htm

Japanese black-and-white films
1956 films
Daiei Film films
1950s Japanese films